The men's welterweight 69 kg boxing event at the 2019 European Games in Minsk was held from 21 to 29 June at the Uruchie Sports Palace.

Results

Final

Top half

Bottom half

References

External links
Draw Sheet

Men 69